China has been on the internet intermittently since May 1989 and on a permanent basis since 20 April 1994, although with limited access. In 2008, China became the country with the largest population on the Internet and, has remained so. As of July 2016, 730,723,960 people (53.2% of the country's total population) were internet users.

China's first foray into the global cyberspace was an email (not TCP/IP based and thus technically not internet) sent on 20 September 1987 to the Karlsruhe Institute of Technology, reading, "Across the Great Wall, we can reach every corner in the world".

History

By the end of 2009, the number of Chinese domestic websites grew to 3.23 million, with an annual increase rate of 12.3%, according to the Ministry of Industry and Information Technology. As of first half of 2010, the majority of the Web content is user-generated.

As of June 2011, Chinese internet users spent an average of 18.7 hours online per week, which would result in a total of about 472 billion hours in 2011.

China had 618 million internet users by the end of December 2013, a 9.5 percent increase over the year before and a penetration rate of 45.8%. By June 2014, there were 632 million internet users in the country and a penetration rate of 46.9%. The number of users using mobile devices to access the internet overtook those using PCs (83.4% and 80.9%, respectively). China replaced the U.S. in its global leadership in terms of installed telecommunication bandwidth in 2011. By 2014, China hosts more than twice as much national bandwidth potential than the U.S., the historical leader in terms of installed telecommunication bandwidth (China: 29% versus US:13% of the global total). As of March 2017, there are about 700 million Chinese internet users, and many of them have a high-speed internet connection. Most of the users live in urban areas but at least 178 million users reside in rural towns.

A majority of broadband subscribers were DSL, mostly from China Telecom and China Netcom. The price varies in different provinces, usually around US$5 – $50/month for a 50M – 1000M ADSL/Fiber (price varies by geographic region).

By 2013, broadband made up the majority of internet connections in China, with 363.8 million users at this service tier. The price of a broadband connection places it well within the reach of the mainland Chinese middle class. Wireless, especially internet access through a mobile phone, has developed rapidly. 500 million were accessing the internet via cell phones in 2013. The number of dial-up users peaked in 2004 and since then has decreased sharply.  Generally statistics on the number of mobile internet users in China show a significant slump in the growth rate between 2008 and 2010, with a small peak in the next two years.

In April 2020, the National Development and Reform Commission (NDRC) proposed that "satellite internet" should be a part of new national infrastructure.  By the next month, Shanghai, Beijing, Fuzhou, Chongqing, Chengdu, and Shenzhen had each proposed regional action plans to support the new satellite internet constellation project with a goal to provide domestic China satellite internet to rural areas. Beginning in 2019, US (SpaceX Starlink) and UK (OneWeb, 2020) private companies had begun fielding large internet satellite constellations with global coverage; however China does not intend to license non-Chinese technical solutions for satellite broadband within the jurisdiction of Chinese law.

Structure
An important characteristic of the Chinese internet is that online access routes are owned by the PRC government, and private enterprises and individuals can only rent bandwidth from the state. The first four major national networks, namely CSTNET, ChinaNet, CERNET and CHINAGBN, are the "backbone" of the mainland Chinese internet. Later dominant telecom providers also started to provide internet services.

In January 2015, China added seven new access points to the world's internet backbone, adding to the three points that connect through Beijing, Shanghai, and Guangzhou.

Public internet services are usually provided by provincial telecom companies, which sometimes are traded between networks. Internet service providers without a nationwide network could not compete with their bandwidth provider, the telecom companies, and often run out of business.
The interconnection between these networks is a big concern for internet users, since internet traffic via the global internet is quite slow. However, major internet services providers are reluctant to aid rivals.

Userbase

The January 2013 China Internet Network Information Center (CNNIC) report states that 56% of internet users were male, and 44% were female, and expresses other data based on sixty thousand surveys.

The majority of Chinese internet users are restricted their use of the internet to Chinese websites, as most of the population has a lack of foreign language skills.

English-language media in China often use the word "netizen" to refer to Chinese internet users in particular.

Content
According to Kaiser Kuo, the internet in China is largely used for entertainment purposes, being referred to as the "entertainment superhighway". However, it also serves as the first public forum for Chinese citizens to freely exchange their ideas. Most users go online to read news, to search for information, and to check their email. They also go to BBS or web forums, find music or videos, or download files.

Content providers
Chinese-language infotainment web portals such as Tencent, Sina.com, Sohu, and 163.com are popular. For example, Sina claimed it has about 94.8 million registered users and more than 10 million active ones engaged in their fee-based services. Other Internet service providers such as the human resource service provider 51job and the electronic commerce web sites such as Alibaba.com are less popular but more successful on their specialty. Their success led some of them to make IPOs.

All websites that operate in China with their own domain name must have an ICP license from the Ministry of Industry and Information Technology. Because the PRC government blocks many foreign websites, many homegrown copycats of foreign websites have appeared.

Search engines

Baidu is the leading search engine in China, while most web portals also provide search opportunities like Bing, Sogou.

Online communities
Although the Chinese write fewer emails, they enjoy other online communication tools. Users form their communities based on different interests. Bulletin boards on portals or elsewhere, chat rooms, instant messaging groups, blogs and microblogs are very active, while photo-sharing and social networking sites are growing rapidly. Some Wikis such as the Sogou Baike and Baidu Baike are "flourishing".

Social media
China is one of the most restricted countries in the world in terms of internet, but these constraints have directly contributed to the staggering success of local Chinese social media sites. The Chinese government makes it impossible for foreign companies to enter the Chinese social media network. Without access to the majority of social media platforms used elsewhere in the world, the Chinese have created their own networks but with more users – which is why every global company pays attention to these sites. Some Chinese famous social medias are Sina Weibo, QQ, Qzone, Renren, Zorpia, and Douban. And in recent years, the use of WeChat has become more and more popular among people in China.

Online shopping
The rapidly increasing number of Internet users in China has also generated a large online shopping base in the country. A large number of Chinese internet users have even been branded as having an "online shopping addiction" as a result of the growth of the industry. According to Sina.com, Chinese consumers with Internet access spend an average of RMB10,000 online annually.

Online Mapping Services
China has endeavored to offer a number of online mapping services and allows the dissemination of geographic information within the country. Tencent Maps (腾讯地图), Baidu Maps (百度地圖) and Tianditu (天地圖) are typical examples. Online mapping services can be understood as online cartography backed up by a geographic information system (GIS). GIS was originally a tool for cartographers, geographers and other types of specialists to store, manage, present and analyze spatial data. In bringing GIS online, the Web has made these tools available to a much wider audience. Furthermore, with the advent of broadband, utilizing GIS has become much faster and easier. Increasingly, non-specialist members of the public can access, look up and make use of geographic information for their own purposes. Tianditu is China's first online mapping service. Literally World Map, Tianditu was launched in late October 2010. The Chinese government has repeatedly claimed that this service is to offer comprehensive geographical data for Chinese users to learn more about the world.

Online payment 
The method of directly paying by online banking is required to be able to make online banking payment after opening online banking and can realize online payment of UnionPay, WeChat Pay, online payment by credit card, and so on.

This payment method is directly paid from the bank card. The third-party payment itself integrates multiple payment methods, and the process is as follows:

1. Recharge the money in online banking to a third-party.

2. Pay by third-party deposit when the user pays.

3. The fee is charged for withdrawal. Third-party payment methods are diverse, including mobile payments and fixed-line payments.

The most commonly used third-party payment is Alipay, Tenpay, Huanxun, Epro, fast money, online banking, and as an independent online merchant or a website with payment services, the most common choice is nothing more than Alipay, Huanxun payment, Epro payment, fast money these four. As of January 2015, Alipay, owned by Alibaba Group has 600 million counts of users and has the largest user group among all online-payment providers.

Online gaming

As of 2009, China is the largest market for online games. The country has 368 million internet users playing online games and the industry was worth US$13.5 billion in 2013. 73% of gamers are male, 27% are female.

In 2007, the Ministry of Culture (MoC) and General Administration of Press and Publication (GAPP) along with several other agencies implemented the Online Game Anti-Addiction System which aimed to stop video game addiction in youth. This system restricted minors from playing more than 3 hours a day and required Identification (ID) checking in order to verify you are of age.

Later in 2019, the Chinese government announced in November that gamers under the age of 18 would be banned from playing video games between the hours of 10 p.m. and 8 a.m. In addition, gamers under 18 would be restricted to 90 minutes of playing during the weekdays and 3 hours of playing during weekends and holidays as per new guidelines.

As of 2021, the National Press and Publication Administration (NPPA) further restricted rules limiting playtime for under-18s to one hour per day from 8p.m. to 9 p.m. and only on Fridays, Saturdays, and Sundays.

Adult content
Although restrictions on political information remain strong, several sexually oriented blogs began appearing in early 2004. Women using the web aliases Muzi Mei (木子美) and Zhuying Qingtong (竹影青瞳) wrote online diaries of their sex lives and became minor celebrities. This was widely reported and criticized in mainland Chinese news media, and several of these bloggers' sites have since been blocked, and remain so to this day. This coincided with an artistic nude photography fad (including a self-published book by dancer Tang Jiali) and the appearance of pictures of minimally clad women or even topless photos in a few Chinese newspapers, magazines and on several websites. Many dating and "adult chat" sites, both Chinese and foreign, have been blocked. Some, however, continue to be accessible, although this appears to be due more to the Chinese government's ignorance of their existence than any particular policy of leniency.

Censorship

The Golden Shield Project was proposed to the State Council by Premier Zhu Rongji in 1993. As a massive surveillance and content control system, it was launched in November 2000, and became known as the Great Firewall of China.  The apparatus of China's Internet control is considered more extensive and more advanced than in any other country in the world. The governmental authorities not only block website content but also monitor the Internet access of individuals; such measures have attracted the derisive nickname "The Great Firewall of China."

However, there are some methods of circumventing the censorship by using proxy servers outside the firewall. Users may circumvent all of the censorship and monitoring of the Great Firewall if they have a secure VPN or SSH connection method to a computer outside mainland China.

Disruptions of VPN services have been reported and many of the free or popular services are now blocked. On 29 July 2017, Apple complied with an order from the Chinese government to remove all VPN apps from its App Store that were not pre-approved by the government.

Different methods are used to block certain websites or pages including DNS poisoning, blocking access to IPs, analyzing and filtering URLs, inspecting filter packets and resetting connections.

Memes
The Baidu 10 Mythical Creatures, initially a humorous hoax, became a popular and widespread internet meme in China. These ten hoaxes reportedly originated in response to increasing online censorship and have become an icon of Chinese internet users' resistance to it.

The State Administration of Press, Publication, Radio, Film and Television issued a directive on 30 March 2009 to highlight 31 categories of content prohibited online, including violence, pornography and content which may "incite ethnic discrimination or undermine social stability". Many Chinese internet users believe the instruction follows the official embarrassment over the "Grass Mud Horse" and the "River Crab". Industry observers believe that the move was designed to stop the spread of parodies or other comments on politically sensitive issues in the runup to the anniversary of the 4 June Tiananmen Square protests.

Cyber attacks

In the second quarter of 2014, China was by far the main country of origin of cyber attacks, with 43% of the worldwide total.

Internet advertising market
The size of China's online advertising market was RMB 3.3 billion in the third quarter 2008, up 19.1% compared with the previous quarter. Tencent, Baidu.com Inc, Sina Corp remain the Top 3 in terms of market share. Keyword advertising market size reached RMB 1.46 billion, accounting for 43.8% of the total Internet advertising market with a quarter-on-quarter growth rate of 19.3%, while that of the online advertising site amounted to RMB 1.70 billion, accounting for 50.7% of the total, up 18.9% compared with the second quarter.

Currently, Baidu has launched the CPA platform, and Sina Corp has launched an advertising scheme for intelligent investment. The moves indicate a market trend of effective advertising with low cost. Online advertisements of automobiles, real estate and finance will keep growing rapidly in the future.

Online encyclopedias
Sogou Baike, 15+ million articles
Baike.com claiming to have more than 18 million articles as of 2020
Baidu Baike, 3.5 million articles
Chinese Wikipedia,  articles

See also

 Golden projects
 Telecommunications in China
 Telecommunications industry in China
 Internet censorship in China
 Golden Shield Project
 China Internet Project
 Human flesh search engine (HFSE)
 List of Internet phenomena in China
 List of Internet slang in China
 Media of China
 All-China Youth Network Civilization Convention

References

 
Computer-related introductions in 1994